Sturlaugs saga starfsama is a legendary saga from the 14th century about Sturlaugr the Industrious, who was the son of a Norwegian Hersir.

After having killed a competing suitor and chased away a second one, he married Åsa the Fair, the daughter of a jarl. Her old foster-mother helps Sturlaugr with advice and predictions. The hero has to undertake a dangerous journey to find the horn of an aurochs and enquire about its origins, which is even more dangerous.

Eventually, Sturlaugr becomes a high chieftain in the Swedish army. His son was Göngu-Hrólf of Göngu-Hrólfs saga.

Sources
Ohlmarks, Åke. (1982). Fornnordiskt lexikon. Tiden.

External links
Entry in the Stories for All Time database
Seventeenth-century edition
The saga in Old Norse at Snerpa.is
The saga in Old Norse at Heimskringla.no
The saga in English

Legendary sagas